Bodewryd is a village in Anglesey, Wales, in the community of Mechell.

St Mary's Church

The village church is St Mary's, Bodewryd, a small medieval church. It is said by the Diocese of Bangor to be the second-smallest church in Anglesey. The date of construction is unknown, but there was a church on this site in 1254 and the earliest feature to which a date can be given is a doorway, said to be from the 15th century or perhaps about 1500. When the church was restored in 1867 after being struck by lightning, stained glass with Islamic-influenced patterns was included in the windows, a requirement of Lord Stanley of Alderley, the church's benefactor, who was a convert to Islam. The church is still in use, as part of the Church in Wales, and is one of five churches in a combined parish.  It is a Grade II listed building, a designation given to "buildings of special interest, which warrant every effort being made to preserve them", in particular because it is a "simple, rural church of Medieval origins."

References

External links 
photos of Bodewryd and surrounding area on geograph

Villages in Anglesey
Mechell, Anglesey